John Albert Sainty (born 24 March 1946 in Poplar, London) was a professional footballer in the 1960s and 1970s who went on to manage Chester City.

Playing career
As a player, Sainty (a forward) progressed through the youth ranks at Tottenham Hotspur and represented England Schoolboys, but he left White Hart Lane in 1967 after failing to make a Football League appearance. Over the next nine years Sainty played for Reading, AFC Bournemouth, Mansfield Town and Aldershot. He ended his career with 221 Football League appearances and 39 goals to his name.

Coaching and Management
Sainty then began a coaching career under John Bond. The duo worked together at Norwich City and Manchester City before Sainty went alone by taking the Chester manager's job (initially on a caretaker basis) in November 1982 after Cliff Sear stepped down.

He led the club to a mid-table finish in Division Four in 1982–83 and the semi-finals of the Football League Trophy, but financial problems meant Sainty was told to halve the wage bill at the end of the season. Most of his signings were non-contract players such as Paul Manns, Paul Raynor, Trevor Phillips, John Ryan and Dennis Wann, while youngsters including Peter Bulmer and Phil Harrington became regulars in the side. Chester endured a miserable start to 1983–84 and had just one league win to their name when Sainty left the club in November 1983. They had though overturned a 3–0 first-leg deficit to knock Bolton Wanderers out of the League Cup in the first round.

Sainty teamed up again with Bond at Burnley, before managing non-league sides Armthorpe Welfare and Mossley. He later became assistant manager to Danny Bergara at Stockport County and worked as academy director at Southampton. He then became head coach at Bemerton Heath Harlequins.

Honours

AFC Bournemouth

 Football League Division Four runners-up: 1970–71 (44 apps, 5 goals).

External links
Norwich City profile

References

English Football League players
Tottenham Hotspur F.C. players
Reading F.C. players
AFC Bournemouth players
Mansfield Town F.C. players
Aldershot F.C. players
Chester City F.C. managers
Armthorpe Welfare F.C. managers
Mossley A.F.C. managers
English football managers
Norwich City F.C. non-playing staff
Manchester City F.C. non-playing staff
1946 births
Footballers from Poplar, London
Living people
English footballers
Association football forwards
Stockport County F.C. non-playing staff
Burnley F.C. non-playing staff
Southampton F.C. non-playing staff